Herbert H. Anderson (1913 – 2001) was an American organic chemist, a member of Glenn Seaborg's Met Lab group at Chicago during the Manhattan Project.  Anderson was a co-inventor, with Larned B. Asprey, of the PUREX  process for plutonium and uranium extraction.

After leaving the Met Lab, Anderson was at Harvard until 1952 
and then for many years (at least 1953–1967) at the Chemistry Department, Drexel Institute of Technology, Philadelphia.

References

1913 births
2001 deaths
University of Chicago people
20th-century American chemists
Manhattan Project people